This is a list of roads across the world named after the Indian anti-colonial nationalist and lawyer, Mohandas Karamchand Gandhi ( Mahatma Gandhi), known for his nonviolent resistance to lead a successful campaign for India's independence from British Rule.

At places, the roads are also known by their abbreviated form 'M.G. Road'. In other countries, Mahatma Gandhi Road is known by different names, Gandhistraat, Gandhiweg, and Gandhiplein being some of them. 

M.G. Road is one of the most frequently used road names in India, Agra having two of them. Several other Indian cities have a road by this name. In 2010, attempts were made to rename Hillcroft Avenue in Houston, Texas to Mahatma Gandhi Avenue but the proponents were unable to secure signatures from 75% of the property owners. As a result, the group settled for renaming the areas around Hillcroft Avenue to Mahatma Gandhi district. In Kolkata, Central Road has renamed Harrison Road in 1892 after Sir Henry Leland Harrison, then the chairman of Calcutta Corporation. It has recently been renamed yet again to Mahatma Gandhi Road. In many cities in South India, Mahatma Gandhi Road is popularly known by other names. In Chennai, it is known as Nungambakkam High Road. In Coimbatore, Mahatma Gandhi Road is popularly known by Avarampalayam Road.

In India

Outside India

See also
 Mehrauli-Gurgaon Road in Delhi is also abbreviated as MG Road

Notes

References

 
 
 
 

 
 

Memorials to Mahatma Gandhi
Gandhi
Gandhi, Mahatma